Parliamentary elections were held in Colombia on 18 March 1962 to elect the Senate and Chamber of Representatives. Under the National Front agreement, only the Conservative Party and the Liberal Party were allowed to contest the elections, with each party allocated 50% of the seats in both houses. As a result, the main contest at the elections was between factions within each party.

Results

Senate

Chamber of Representatives

References

Parliamentary elections in Colombia
Colombia
1962 in Colombia